Bíró is a Hungarian surname meaning "judge". Notable people with the name include:

 Anton Biró (fl. 1854), one of the initial partners in Vienna company eventually known as Waagner-Biro
 Borbala Biro (b. 1957), Hungarian biologist and agricultural scientist
 Gyula Bíró (1890–1961), Hungarian Olympic football player 
 László Bíró (1899–1985), inventor of the ballpoint pen
 Lajos Bíró (1880–1948), novelist, playwright, and screenwriter
 Charles Biro (1911–1972), comic book writer
 Sari Biro (1912–1990), pianist
 Val Biro (1921–2014), children's writer and artist
 Ferenc Puskás (1927–2006), Hungarian footballer (known as Ferenc Puskás Biró on Spanish documents)

Hungarian-language surnames